The discography of Cœur de pirate, a Canadian indie pop singer-songwriter, consists of eight studio albums, two extended plays, fourteen singles (including three as a featured performer and two promotional releases) and ten music videos. Cœur de pirate began her career in 2007 as the keyboardist for the band Bonjour Brumaire. That year she also began to record solo material and placed several demos on the social networking service Myspace.

Her self-titled solo debut studio album was released in September 2008. It reached number two on the French albums chart and was certified triple platinum by the Syndicat National de l'Édition Phonographique (SNEP). The following year, Cœur de pirate was nominated for "Francophone Album of the Year" at the Canadian Juno Awards. Four singles, "Comme des enfants", 
"Pour un infidèle", "Ensemble" and "Francis", were released from the album: "Pour un infidèle", a collaboration with Nouvelle Star winner Julien Doré, reached number one on the French singles chart. In late 2010, Cœur de pirate collaborated with alternative band Bedouin Soundclash on the song "Brutal Hearts" from their studio album Light the Horizon. The song marked her English language singing debut.

Cœur de pirate worked extensively with producer Howard Bilerman in recording her second studio album Blonde. Released in November 2011, the album is a hybrid of genres, combining pop, cabaret, tango and country music. It peaked at number two in the Wallonia region of Belgium and at number five in Canada and France.
 In 2012, it was nominated for the Canadian Polaris Music Prize. Two singles were released from the album: "Adieu" and "Golden Baby", both of which reached the top ten in Belgium.

Studio albums

Extended plays

Singles

As a main artist

As a featured artist

Promotional singles

Guest appearances

Music videos

Notes

References

External links
 
 

Discographies of Canadian artists
Pop music discographies